In Ovid's, Metamorphoses, Orchamus (Ancient Greek: Ορχάμος) was a king of Persia ("in the land of spices").

Family 
Orchamus was the seventh in line from Belus and the father of Leucothoe who was a lover of Helios the Sun.

Mythology 
Helios disguised himself as Leucothoe's mother, Eurynome, to gain entrance to her chambers. Clytia, a previous lover of Helios, consumed with jealousy, told Orchamus of his daughter's affair. So Orchamus, "fierce and merciless" buried Leucothoe alive. She died before Helios could save her, and he turned her into a frankincense tree. Clytia, scorned by Helios, sat on the ground pining away, neither eating nor drinking, constantly turning her face toward the Sun, until finally she became the heliotrope, whose flowers follow the Sun across the sky every day.

Notes

References
 Gantz, Timothy, Early Greek Myth: A Guide to Literary and Artistic Sources, Johns Hopkins University Press, 1996, Two volumes:  (Vol. 1),  (Vol. 2).
 Hard, Robin, The Routledge Handbook of Greek Mythology: Based on H.J. Rose's "Handbook of Greek Mythology", Psychology Press, 2004, . Google Books.
 Ovid. Metamorphoses, Volume I: Books 1-8. Translated by Frank Justus Miller. Revised by G. P. Goold. Loeb Classical Library No. 42. Cambridge, Massachusetts: Harvard University Press, 1977, first published 1916. . Online version at Harvard University Press.
 Parada, Carlos, Genealogical Guide to Greek Mythology, Jonsered, Paul Åströms Förlag, 1993. .
 Tripp, Edward, Crowell's Handbook of Classical Mythology, Thomas Y. Crowell Co; First edition (June 1970). .

Kings in Greek mythology